

See also 
 United States House of Representatives elections, 1796 and 1797
 List of United States representatives from New Jersey

References 

1797
New Jersey
United States House of Representatives